Cavalcade  is a 1960 Argentine film directed by Albert Arliss and Richard von Schenk and starring Ruth Niehaus and Helmuth Schneider.

References

External links

1960 films
1960s Spanish-language films
Argentine black-and-white films
1960s Argentine films